The rufous casiornis (Casiornis rufus) is a species of bird in the family Tyrannidae.
It is found in northern Argentina, Bolivia, mid-central Brazil, Paraguay, and northeastern Uruguay; it is a vagrant to eastern Peru and more northern parts of the Amazon Rainforest.
Its natural habitats are subtropical or tropical dry forests and subtropical or tropical moist lowland forests.

References

rufous casiornis
Birds of the Gran Chaco
Birds of Bolivia
Birds of Brazil
Birds of Paraguay
rufous casiornis
Taxa named by Louis Jean Pierre Vieillot
Taxonomy articles created by Polbot